Abu Mansur al-Faḍl ibn Ahmad al-Mustazhir (1092 – 29 August 1135) better known by his regnal name Al-Mustarshid Billah was the Abbasid caliph in Baghdad from 1118 to 1135. He was son of his predecessor, caliph al-Mustazhir. He succeeded his father in the year 1118 as the Abbasid caliph. He was also an Arabic poet.

Biography 
Al-Mustarshid was born in 1092. He was son of Caliph Al-Mustazhir. His mother was a Slavic concubine named Lubanah. She was from Baghdad. His was named Al-Fadl by his father. His full name was Al-Fadl ibn Ahmad al-Mustazhir and his Kunya was Abu Mansur. After the death of his father in 1135, he succeeded him as Caliph.

Al-Mustarshid achieved more independence as a ruler while the Seljuk sultan Mahmud II was engaged in war in the East. In 1122, al-Mustarshid deposed and imprisoned his vizier Amid al-dawla Jalal al-Din Hasan ibn Ali.  Mahmud II then imposed Ahmad ibn Nizam al-Mulk as his vizier.

In 1123,  Banu Mazyad general Dubais ibn Sadaqah tried to take advantage of the momentary lack of power and, after plundering Bosra, attacked Baghdad together with a young brother of the sultan, Ghiyath ad-Din Mas’ud (known as Mas'ud) He was however crushed by an army under Zengi and Ahmad ibn Nizam al-Mulk. During the same year, al-Mustarshid removed Ahmad ibn Nizam al-Mulk as his vizier. In 1125, it was the time of al-Mustarshid to rebel. He sent an army to take Wasit but was defeated near Baghdad and imprisoned in his palace the next year.

After the death of Mahmud II, a civil war broke out in the Seljuk western territories. Zengi was recalled to the east by certain rebel members, stimulated by the caliph and Dubais. Zengi was beaten and fled. The caliph pursued him to Mosul, and besieged him there but without success for three months. It was nonetheless a milestone in the revival of the military power of the caliphate.

Zengi now resumed operations in Syria and, in 1134, laid siege to Damascus, but was induced, partly by the bravery of the enemy, partly at the instance of the caliph, to whom Zengi had made some concession in the public prayers, to relinquish the attempt. Recalled again by troubles in the east, he was unable to do much against the Crusaders till after al-Mustarshid's death.

Not long after the siege of Damascus, al-Mustarshid launched a military campaign against Seljuk sultan Mas'ud, who had obtained the title in Baghdad in January 1133 by the caliph himself. The rival armies met near Hamadan.  The caliph, deserted by his troops, was taken prisoner, and pardoned on the promising not to quit his palace. Left in the caliphal tent, however, in the sultan's absence, he was found murdered while reading the Quran, as is supposed, by an emissary of the Assassins, who had no love for the caliph.  Modern historians have suspected that Mas'ud instigated the murder although the two most important historians of the period Ibn al-Athir and Ibn al-Jawzi did not speculate on this matter.

Physically, al-Mustarshid was a red-haired man with blue eyes and freckles. He was succeeded by his son al-Rashid.

Family
Al-Mustarshid's only wife was the daughter of Seljuk Sultan Ahmad Sanjar. They married in 1124. One of his concubines was Khushf. She was from Iraq, and was the mother of his son, the future Caliph Al-Rashid Billah.

Succession
He was succeeded by his son al-Rashid Billah in the year 1135. He ruled for just one year from 1135 up to his deposition on 17 August 1136. When the populace of Baghdad rose in revolt against him. His son was succeeded by his half-brother al-Muqtafi on 17 September 1136.

Al-Muqtafi was the son of al-Mustazhir was a concubine named Ashin. She was from Syria, and was the mother of the future Caliph Al-Muqtafi.

See also
 Al-Hakim I, an alleged great-great-great grandson of the Caliph al-Mustarshid, descendant of his son Ali ibn al-Mustarshid.
 Anushirvan ibn Khalid, a Persian vizier of the Caliph Al-Mustarshid served from 1132 to 1134.
 Ahmad Sanjar, father-in-law of Caliph Al-Mustarshid.

References

Notes

Sources
This text is partly adapted from William Muir's public domain, The Caliphate: Its Rise, Decline, and Fall.
Hanne, Eric.  Putting the Caliph in his Place.
اغتيال الخليفة المسترشد بالله 

1092 births
1135 deaths
12th-century Abbasid caliphs
Assassinated caliphs
12th-century murdered monarchs
12th-century Arabic poets
Nizari Ismaili–Seljuk relations
People of the Nizari–Seljuk wars
Victims of the Order of Assassins
Sons of Abbasid caliphs